Mia Novoa is a character in the television series Grachi, is interpreted by actress, model and singer Venezuelan Maria Gabriela de Faria.  She is a new witch who studies in Escolarium, She is very bad and selfish and will do anything to be Daniel's girlfriend and destroy Grachi. Her first appearance was in the last episode of the first season of Grachi where a flower Grachi damaged had created and Escolarium breaking a glass with magic.

Her eyes showed very strong orange color which meant hatred and evil. She also has a birthmark shaped like a chandelier.

Personality 
Mia is very selfish, brilliant and intelligent. She thinks all witches should use their powers to have fun and make everything easier, so she uses magic to solve her problems. She does not throw her spells as Grachi and Matilda do.  Instead she castes spells by closing her hand and leaving two fingers up being the index and the middle. When Athena Grachi cast the spell of forgetfulness on her, she was in another world and knew nothing of magic, but when Matilda, who was not affected by the spell, said she is a witch, she made spells with the finger.

Second season 
In the first episode of the 2nd season was her second appearance. The program begins where she is in her room that is purple, she gets up from her bed, using her magic dress and places her shoes one at a time with magic. Her older brother Ignacio "Nacho," who knows nothing of magic, comes and says that breakfast is ready and that she should tidy her room, which she does with magic  Nacho comes back, offering to help, but she says it's not necessary as she is done already. Then she decides to stroll Enchanted City (home), and meets Lucia Grachi and makes a spell to hear what they were discussing. Grachi Lucia told him not to worry of evil witches because she is the Chosen (the most powerful witch, but no more than the tip), then wanted to go to the mall and opposite Grachi to pull conjures up a shelf full of many things but just then Grachi lifts, Mia showed making powers all the perfumes that she wanted to appear in her purse and commercial security came and told him to give the bag to check, but Mia threw a spell that made everything she would give it to him without to pay. In the last episode of the 2nd season she, Leo and Athena were becoming a wedding caeos Ursula and Francisco. In the end they are losing, Leo dies electrocuted, Athena was taken to prison for Ivis and Priscilla, as she and Matilda Grachi memory erased.

References

External links 
 Series website in Mundonick
 Series website (private)

Telenovela characters
Fictional witches